The 1984 Australian Grand Prix was a race for Formula Mondial racing cars, held at Calder Park Raceway in Victoria, Australia on 18 November 1984. It was contested over a distance of 160.9 km (100 laps x 1.609 km) or an even 100 miles.

The race was the forty ninth Australian Grand Prix, the fifth to be held at Calder and the fourth to be held specifically for Formula Pacific / Formula Mondial racing cars. It was the last Australian Grand Prix to be held prior to the race becoming a round of the Formula One World Championship the following year.

Race
The race was won by Brazilian driver Roberto Moreno, his third win during the four years in which the Grand Prix was held for the Formula Pacific / Formula Mondial category. While Formula Mondial would continue as the premier Australian open-wheel racing category for another two years, and would not be completely replaced until the creation of Formula Holden in 1989, this was the last year it would be associated with the Australian Grand Prix, as the race was granted Formula One World Championship status from 1985 and would be contested only by Formula One cars. In many ways, Australian domestic open-wheel racing would be deprived of a signature race by the arrival of Formula One, a situation that continues as of 2015.

The trend of the race organiser Bob Jane of importing overseas star racers (mostly Formula One drivers) continued. In addition to Moreno, the starters for the 1984 race included ,  and  F1 World Champion Niki Lauda,  F1 World Champion Keke Rosberg, as well as Formula One drivers Andrea de Cesaris and François Hesnault.

De Cesaris started from an unguarded pit lane ahead of the field and led the race briefly, although official lap scoring started his race when he started his second lap. 1984 Australian Drivers' Championship winner and front row qualifier, John Bowe, led the race until lap 9 when overtaken by Moreno after a loose spark plug lead caused his 1.6-litre Ford engine to misfire. He was forced to pit for a replacement plug lead. Poor starts by Moreno's teammate for the race, Niki Lauda, Rosberg and de Cesaris were overcome as the race progressed. Both keen aviators, Lauda and Rosberg had actually spent most of practice and qualifying attending an air show at the nearby Essendon Airport, with newly crowned World Champion Lauda stating that he was in Australia mostly for a holiday and just to get away from Europe. Hesnault, Bowe's teammate, retired after a bump with Bruce Connolly. Lauda and Rosberg diced briefly for third, before Rosberg and Terry Ryan clashed when Ryan was being lapped, with the closely following Lauda also colliding with Ryan, the result being that Rosberg and Ryan were able to continue while Lauda was out. Bowe dropped down the field with electrical problems. First Rosberg then de Cesaris caught and overtook the Tiga FA81/83 of Alfredo Costanzo to fill the podium positions. Bowe finished sixth behind David McMillan.

The Ralt RT4 was the choice of car for three-quarters of the field, with 18 of the 24 starters driving one. Other cars included Costanzo's Tiga FA81/83, two Cheetah Mk.8's, a Kaditcha FA82A, a Liston BF2 and a Dart 83M. All cars were powered by the 1.6-litre Ford BDA 4 cylinder engine. Touring car driver Peter Williamson was entered in a Toyota powered Toleman TG860, but a crash in early practice that damaged the car saw him announce his retirement from open wheel racing. Consequently, the Toleman was withdrawn from the meeting.

Due largely to the Australian Grand Prix becoming a round of the Formula One World Championship from 1985, John Bowe became the last Australian driver to lead an AGP until Mark Webber led lap 21 of the 2006 Australian Grand Prix in a Williams FW28-Cosworth. With Moreno taking the lead from Bowe on lap 9 of the race, it would be a total of 1,504 race laps before Webber would next put an Australian in the lead of an Australian Grand Prix.

Classification 
Results as follows:

Qualifying

Race

 Winner's race time: 1 h 10 min 51.39 s 
 Winner's average speed: 136.33 km/h (74.71 mph)
 Fastest lap: Niki Lauda: 41.27 s, 140.4 km/h (87.3 mph)

References

Further reading
 Barry Catford, The end of an era: 1984 Australian Grand Prix, Australian Motor Racing Year 1984/85, pages 84 to 92

Grand Prix
Australian Grand Prix
Australian Grand Prix